The Mountainville Grange Hall is located on NY 32 just south of the hamlet of Mountainville in the town of Cornwall, Orange County, New York, United States. Built in 1904, the National Grange sold it in 1984 to the Jerusalem Temple Lodge No. 721, a local Masonic body, and it was renamed the Cornwall Masonic Temple.

While the Masonic lodge has made some renovations, such as improving the kitchen and meeting spaces, the original character of the building has generally been preserved. It is still used today by Jerusalem Temple Lodge and its appendant Order of the Eastern Star chapter. On June 3, 1996 it was listed on the National Register of Historic Places.

Building

It is a two-story three-by-six-bay frame building on a stone foundation, sided in white clapboard covered with aluminum on the first story and green wood shingles on the second. The gabled roof is itself shingled in asphalt, pierced by a brick chimney near the west (rear) end.

A sunburst-patterned vent is in the middle of the attic level on the eastern (front) facade. The center bay at the first story projects slightly to accommodate the main entrance, two paneled and recessed wooden doors in a plain frame. A porch extends across the first story, with a flat roof supported by four rectangular Doric columns connected by a balustrade. The porch roofline has a plain cornice and frieze with "Mountainville Grange 946 P of H" written on it. It has since been covered with a wooden sign saying "Cornwall Masonic Temple".

Inside the building follows a common Grange hall plan: dining room and kitchen on the first floor, meeting room and stage on the second. This and its furnishings and trim are unaltered.

History

The Grange had flourished in the Great Plains states, where it had been strong in the 1870s as part of the Populist movement. Membership overall declined in the following decade, but in the 1890s its influence rose in the East as farmers coped with the impact of modern technologies and economies on agricultural production.

In Mountainville, the Grange chapter was founded just before Christmas 1902. The hall was built two years later, and continued to be used as both a meeting place for the members and informal community center until the 1960s, when Grange membership declined steeply. It was home to an antique store during the 1970s, and was restored to its original organizational function in 1984 when Jerusalem Temple Lodge bought it.

At some point in the later 20th century, aluminum siding was installed on the first story, over the original clapboard. There have been no other modifications to the building.

It is currently being used as a daycare center.

References

External links
Jerusalem Temple Lodge No. 721 site.

Grange organizations and buildings in New York (state)
Masonic buildings in New York (state)
Buildings and structures in Orange County, New York
National Register of Historic Places in Orange County, New York
Cornwall, New York
Buildings and structures completed in 1904
Grange buildings on the National Register of Historic Places